1849 Peter Hardeman Burnett
1851 John Bigler 
1853 John Bigler
1855 John Bigler 
1857 John B. Weller
1859 Milton Latham
1861 John Conness 
1863 John G. Downey ,
1867 H. H. Haight
1871 H. H. Haight 
1875 William Irwin
1879 Hugh J. Glenn
1882 George Stoneman
1886 Washington Bartlett1890 Edward B. Pond1894 James Budd
1898 James G. Maguire 
1902 Franklin K. Lane1906 Theodore A. Bell1910 Theodore A. Bell1914 J. B. Curtin1918 
1922 Thomas Lee Woolwine1926 Justus S. Wardell1930 Milton K. Young1934 Upton Sinclair1938 Culbert Olson
1942 Culbert Olson 
1946 Earl Warren,
1950 James Roosevelt 
1954 Richard P. Graves1958 Edmund G. "Pat" Brown 
1962 Edmund G. "Pat" Brown
1966 Edmund G. "Pat" Brown 
1970 Jess Unruh 
1974 Jerry Brown
1978 Jerry Brown
1982 Tom Bradley1986 Tom Bradley1990 Dianne Feinstein 
1994 Kathleen Brown1998 Gray Davis
2002 Gray Davis
2006 Phil Angelides 
2010 Jerry Brown
2014 Jerry Brown
2018 Gavin Newsom

All except those in italics'' won the general election and were elected Governor of California.

Notes

 
Politicians|California Democrats